Anatomidae is a family of minute sea snails, marine gastropod mollusks in the clade Vetigastropoda (according to the taxonomy of the Gastropoda by Bouchet & Rocroi, 2005).

Anatomidae was raised to the rank of subfamily to the rank of family in a study by Geiger & Jansen (2004). Bouchet & Rocroi placed it in the superfamily Scissurelloidea. This was disputed in 2008 by Yasunori Kano  who does not believe that Anatomidae should be separated from Scissurellidae and actually states that it is the subfamily Anatominae. He suggests that this result was induced by contamination or mislabelling.

This family has no subfamilies.

Genera 
Genera within the family Anatomidae include:
 Anatoma Woodward, 1859
 Sasakiconcha Geiger, 2006
Genera brought into synonymy
 Hainella Bandel, 1998: synonym of Anatoma Woodward, 1859
 Schizotrochus Monterosato, 1877: synonym of Anatoma Woodward, 1859
 Thieleella Bandel, 1998: synonym of Anatoma Woodward, 1859

References 

 

 Geiger D.L. (2012) Monograph of the little slit shells. Volume 1. Introduction, Scissurellidae. pp. 1-728. Volume 2. Anatomidae, Larocheidae, Depressizonidae, Sutilizonidae, Temnocinclidae. pp. 729-1291. Santa Barbara Museum of Natural History Monographs Number 7.